Semibugry is a rural locality (a selo) and the administrative center of Semibugrinsky Selsoviet, Kamyzyaksky District, Astrakhan Oblast, Russia. The population was 1,778 as of 2010. There are 12 streets.

Geography 
It is located on the Bolda River, 29 km northeast of Kamyzyak (the district's administrative centre) by road. Chilimny is the nearest rural locality.

References 

Rural localities in Kamyzyaksky District